John Stephen Spray (December 16, 1940 – May 15, 2020) was an American professional golfer who played on the PGA Tour in the 1960s and 1970s.

Spray was born in Des Moines, Iowa and reared in Indianola, Iowa. His first big win as an amateur came in the 1958 Iowa Junior Amateur; the next year he gained national fame by winning the Western Junior. Spray attended the University of Iowa initially, but transferred to Eastern New Mexico University where he spent most of his college career. He won the NAIA Championship in 1962 and 1963 while at Eastern New Mexico.

Spray turned professional in 1964 and began play on the PGA Tour in 1965. The highlight of Spray's career came in 1969 with a win at the San Francisco Open Invitational, the last PGA Tour event held at San Francisco's storied Harding Park. His best finish in a major championship was a T-5 at the 1968 U.S. Open. Spray was hampered by injuries during the last years of his PGA career including tendinitis in his left thumb that forced him to change his grip and back surgery that caused him to miss almost all of 1974.

After leaving the PGA Tour, Spray began working as the head pro at St. Louis Country Club in 1976 – a position he held for more than 30 years. In 1984, he was honored as the Gateway Section PGA Player of the Year, and was inducted into the Iowa Golf Hall of Fame in May 2009.

Spray died in Chesterfield, Missouri on May 15, 2020.

Amateur wins
1958 Iowa Junior Amateur
1959 Western Junior
1962 Northwest Amateur, Central States Amateur, NAIA Championship
1963 Iowa Amateur, Central States Amateur, Tournament of Champions, NAIA Championship

Professional wins (8)

PGA Tour wins (1)

Other wins (7)
1964 Iowa Open
1966 Waterloo Open Golf Classic
1972 Herman Sani
1973 New Mexico Open, Arizona Open
1977 Gateway Section PGA Championship
1979 Gateway Section PGA Championship

References

External links

American male golfers
PGA Tour golfers
PGA Tour Champions golfers
Golfers from Iowa
Iowa Hawkeyes men's track and field athletes
Eastern New Mexico Greyhounds men's track and field athletes
Sportspeople from Des Moines, Iowa
People from Indianola, Iowa
1940 births
2020 deaths